Freenex Co, Ltd. is a Korean company that supplies navigation systems for electronics and automotive applications. It is headquartered in Gil-dong Gangdong-gu Seoul, Korea, established in 2002. Freenex companies develop consumer and aviation technologies employing the Global Positioning System. Freenex also creates OEM products for BMW, Hyundai Autonet, WIA brand navigation automotive markets and for Vitas.

Products include television, navigated teletext, digital maps and navigation. Its primary competitor in Hyundai Autonet and Garmin. Freenex CEO is Lee Woo Yeol (이우열).

Products
L-Vision model:520
H-Vision model:2200, 700
D-Vision model:700, 750, 720G
DM-720CL
DXM-760
DMB-100

Major competitors
Hyundai Autonet
Thinkway
Exroad
Garmin

See also
Automotive navigation system

References

External links
Freenex Homepage (Korean)

Navigation system companies
Auto parts suppliers of South Korea
Manufacturing companies based in Seoul
Electronics companies of South Korea
South Korean brands
Automotive companies established in 2002
South Korean companies established in 2002
Global Positioning System